Gocław may refer to the following places in Poland:
Gocław, Warsaw
Gocław, Szczecin
Gocław, Kuyavian-Pomeranian Voivodeship
Gocław, Masovian Voivodeship